Ó Conghalaigh is a Gaelic-Irish surname. It derives from the forename Conghal, meaning "fierce as a hound". It is often anglicised as Connolly, Connally, Connelly and occasionally as Conley. In modern Irish it may be spelled as Ó Conghaile.

Overview

A number of distinct and unrelated families bore the surname in Gaelic Ireland, and with a number of spelling variants. They included:

 Ó Conghalaigh of Iar Connacht (now County Galway)
 Ó Coingheallaigh in the Kingdom of Desmond (now west County Cork)
 Ó Conghalaigh of Derrygonnelly, Fear Manach (now County Fermanagh)
 Ó Conghalaigh of Airgíalla (now County Monaghan and/or County Meath)
 Ó Conghaile Muirthemne from County Louth

In 1890 the surname was the twenty-third most common in Ireland, with three hundred and eighty-one births of the name, mostly in Ulster. By 1996, the ranking had slipped to thirty-third.

The variant Conneely was found exclusively in Connacht in 1890, with most occurrences in County Galway, giving Ballyconneely its name.

County Monaghan

The Ó Conghalaigh's of Airgíalla were either a branch of the Southern Uí Néill who removed to Airgíalla, or a branch of the Mac Mathghamna, kings of Airgíalla from the mid-13th century to 1590.

John Grenham says of them "They are first noted as coming to prominence in the fifteenth century and are recorded as having "Chiefs of the Name" up to the 17th century. They were instrumental in organising the native Irish Rebellion of 1641 and, following its failure, lost their power and possessions." Descendants of this family included William Conolly (1662–1729), James Connolly (1870–1916) and Paudge Connolly (born 1953).

County Galway

Descendants of the Ó Conghalaigh of Iar Connacht include TG4 presenter Eibhlín Ní Chonghaile; musicians John Conneely and Johnny Óg Connolly; sportspersons Aislinn Connolly, Joe Connolly, Michael Conneely and Seamus Conneely; Mayors of Galway Catherine Connolly, Martin Connolly and Pádraig Conneely; scribe Micheál Ó Conghaile; writers Micheál Ó Conghaile (writer) and Seán Ó Conghaile.

References
 Speaker Connolly and his connections, privately printed, 1907.
 Clogerici: The Connollys of Fermanagh and Co. Monaghan, P. O Gallachair, Clogher Record II, Clogher Diocesan Historical Society, Drogheda, 1953.
 The Dickson and Connolly families of Ballyshannon, J. M. McWilliam, Donegal Annual IV, 1959.

External links

See also 
 Connolly (surname)
 Connelly (surname)

Surnames
Irish families
Surnames of Irish origin
Irish-language surnames
Families of Irish ancestry